Materija is a small settlement in the Municipality of Hrpelje-Kozina in the Littoral region of Slovenia. It lies between fields and meadows in the Materija Lowland, a dry karst valley bottom, along Route 7 from Rijeka to Trieste.

References

External links

Materija on Geopedia

Populated places in the Municipality of Hrpelje-Kozina